Andrea Elizabeth Dawkins is an Australian former politician. She  represented Bass in the Tasmanian House of Assembly from 9 June 2015, when she was elected in a countback to replace Kim Booth, until 3 March 2018, when she was defeated at the 2018 state election. She represented the Tasmanian Greens.

In August 2018, Dawkins announced that she would stand for deputy mayor of the City of Launceston as an independent, confirming she had ended her membership of the Greens.

Dawkins attended Launceston College, and holds a Diploma of Management. Prior to her election, Dawkins served as an alderman on Launceston City Council. She also developed and ran a social enterprise café called "Fresh on Charles" on Charles Street, Launceston from 1999 until 2013, when she sold the business. Following this, she worked in business development at Josef Chromy Wines, and later as manager of the Launceston Harvest Market.

Dawkins is a vegetarian and animal welfare advocate. She has two daughters with partner Mark Kershaw.

References

1960s births
Living people
Members of the Tasmanian House of Assembly
Australian Greens members of the Parliament of Tasmania
Tasmanian local councillors
Politicians from Launceston, Tasmania
Place of birth missing (living people)
21st-century Australian politicians
Women members of the Tasmanian House of Assembly
Women local councillors in Australia
21st-century Australian women politicians